Cenchrometopa is a genus of picture-winged flies in the family Ulidiidae.

Species
 C. curvinervis

References

"

Ulidiidae
Brachycera genera